A number of steamships have been named Fangturm, including :-

, a Deutsche Hansa Linie cargo ship in service 1908-21
, a Deutsche Hansa Linie cargo ship in service 1956-61
, a Deutsche Hansa Linie cargo ship in service 1944-45

Ship names